Nancy Sarah Goroff (born February 18, 1968) is an American organic chemist who is chair of the chemistry department at Stony Brook University. Her research investigates conjugated organic molecules, including polymers, halocarbons and buckyballs. During the 2020 United States elections Goroff ran to represent New York's 1st congressional district, and was defeated by the incumbent, Lee Zeldin.

Early life and education 	
Goroff studied chemistry at Harvard University.

Scientific career 
Goroff was an National Science Foundation (NSF) postdoctoral fellow at the Michigan State University, where she worked in the laboratory of James (Ned) Jackson. At MSU she worked on the synthesis and study of carbenes, as well as on chemical education with Brian Coppola.

In 1997 Goroff joined the faculty of Stony Brook University. The Goroff laboratory design conjugated organic molecules, including polymers, halocarbons and buckybelts. Amongst these, Goroff is interested in organoiodine compounds (including iodoalkynes) and halogenated cumulenes. She has investigated the chemical, material and photophysical properties of poly(diiododiacetylene), a polymer known as PIDA. Goroff has shown that suspending solutions of PIDA in pyrrolidine results in the formation of a highly conductive material. Conjugated molecular belts, where the deconjugated π-system is shaped into a cylinder. The belts are not dissimilar to buckminsterfullerene, a spherical carbon allotrope, but has open edges that can be functionalised further. These belts have potential for nanoscale switches.

In 2013 Goroff was appointed the Associate Provost for the Integration of Research at Stony Brook University.

Goroff is a member of the Union of Concerned Scientists.

Political career 

Throughout the 2018 election cycle she became concerned about the anti-illegal-immigrant rhetoric of three-term Republican incumbent Lee Zeldin. In 2020 Goroff ran for the 2020 United States House of Representatives, going on leave from her faculty position at Stony Brook University. On June 23 she won the Democratic primary, with 36.1 percent of the vote, finishing ahead of 2018 nominee Perry Gershon. In November, she faced incumbent Lee Zeldin in the general election, losing by 9.8%. If elected, Goroff would have been the first congresswoman to have earned a PhD.

Electoral history

Awards and honors 
 2000 National Science Foundation CAREER Award
 2003 Thieme Award
 2011 Stony Brook University Award for Excellence in Service
 2013 American Chemical Society Award for Creative Research and Applications of Iodine Chemistry

Selected publications

References

External links 
Faculty website
Campaign website

Living people
American women chemists
Organic chemists
Stony Brook University faculty
Harvard College alumni
University of California, Los Angeles alumni
New York (state) Democrats
20th-century American chemists
20th-century American women scientists
21st-century American chemists
21st-century American women scientists
Scientists from Chicago
Candidates in the 2020 United States elections
Jewish women scientists
Jewish scientists
1968 births
American women academics